Melanophryniscus biancae is a species of toads in the family Bufonidae, first found in the Atlantic Forest in Santa Catarina, Brazil. It is found at intermediate-high altitudes and has a phytotelm-breeding reproductive strategy. It is distinguished from its cogenerate species based on differences in snout-vent length; having white and/or yellow spots on its forearms, mouth, belly and cloaca; the pattern and arrangement of warts; and the presence and number of corneous spines. It might be threatened by habitat loss. It was named in honor of Bianca Reinert due to her conservation efforts.

References

biancae
Amphibians described in 2015